The Orth C. Galloway House is a historic house at 504 Park Street in Clarendon, Arkansas.  It is a -story wood-frame structure, with Colonial Revival styling designed by George Franklin Barber.  It was built in 1910 for Orth Galloway, owner of a local lumber mill.  Barber's design is of a considerably higher style than was typically found in his pattern-book publications, which were widely used in the southern US.  Its most prominent feature is its two-story Classical Revival entrance portico, supported by clustered Doric columns.

The house was listed on the National Register of Historic Places in 1980.

See also
National Register of Historic Places listings in Monroe County, Arkansas

References

Houses on the National Register of Historic Places in Arkansas
Colonial Revival architecture in Arkansas
Houses completed in 1910
Houses in Monroe County, Arkansas
National Register of Historic Places in Monroe County, Arkansas